Euphorbia is a highly diverse plant genus, comprising some 5,000 currently accepted taxa.

This is an alphabetical list of the Euphorbia species and notable intraspecific taxa.

The list includes the former (and never generally accepted) genus Chamaesyce, as well as the related genera Elaeophorbia, Endadenium, Monadenium, Synadenium and Pedilanthus which according to recent DNA sequence-based phylogenetic studies are all nested within Euphorbia

Noticeably succulent plants are marked by (s).

P

Euphorbia pachyclada S.Carter (s)
Euphorbia pachypoda Urb.
Euphorbia pachypodioides Boiteau (s)
Euphorbia pachyrrhiza Kar. & Kir.
Euphorbia pachysantha Baill. (s)
Euphorbia paganorum A.Chev. (s)
Euphorbia palmeri Engelm. ex S.Watson - Wood spurge, woodland spurge
Euphorbia paludicola McVaugh
Euphorbia palustris L. - Marsh spurge
Euphorbia pamirica (Prokh.) Prokh.
Euphorbia pampeana Speg. (s)
Euphorbia pancheri Baillon (s)
Euphorbia panchganiensis Blatt. & McCann ex Blatt. (s)
Euphorbia pancicii G.Beck
Euphorbia paniculata Desf.
Euphorbia panjutinii Grossh.
Euphorbia pantomalaca Standl. & Steyerm. (s)
Euphorbia papilionum S.Carter (s)
Euphorbia papillaris  (Jan ex Boiss.) Raffaelli & Ricceri (s)
Euphorbia papillosa A.St.-Hil. (s)
Euphorbia papillosa var. erythrorrhiza (Boiss.) Subils (s)
Euphorbia papillosa var. papillosa (s)
Euphorbia papillosicapsa L.C.Leach (s)
Euphorbia paradoxa (Schur) Simonk.
Euphorbia paralias L. - Sea spurge
Euphorbia paranensis Dusén
Euphorbia parciflora Urb.
Euphorbia parciramulosa Schweinf. (s)
Euphorbia paredonensis (Millsp.) Oudejans
Euphorbia parifolia N.E.Br.
Euphorbia parishii Greene
Euphorbia parodii Oudejans
Euphorbia parryi Engelm.
Euphorbia parva N.E.Br.
Euphorbia parvicaruncula D.C.Hassall (s)
Euphorbia parviceps L.C.Leach (s)
Euphorbia parvicyathophora Rauh (s)
Euphorbia parviflora L.
Euphorbia parvula Delile
Euphorbia patula P.Miller
Euphorbia patentispina S.Carter (s)
Euphorbia paucipila Urb.
Euphorbia pauciradiata Blatt.
Euphorbia paulianii Ursch & Leandri (s)
Euphorbia paxiana Dinter
Euphorbia pedemontana L.C.Leach (s)
Euphorbia pedersenii Subils
Euphorbia pediculifera Engelm.
Euphorbia pedilanthoides Denis (s)
Euphorbia pedroi Molero & Rovira (s)
Euphorbia peganoides Boiss.
Euphorbia peisonis Rech.
Euphorbia pekinensis Rupr.
Euphorbia pekinensis ssp. asoensis Kurosawa & H.Ohashi
Euphorbia pekinensis ssp. fauriei Kurosawa & H.Ohashi
Euphorbia pekinensis ssp. lasiocaula Boiss. & Oudejans
Euphorbia pekinensis ssp. pekinensis
Euphorbia pekinensis ssp. pseudolucorum Hurus. & Oudejans
Euphorbia pekinensis ssp. sinanensis Hurus. & Oudejans
Euphorbia pekinensis ssp. subulatifolius Hurus. & T.B.Lee
Euphorbia pekinensis ssp. watanabei Makino & Oudejans
Euphorbia pellegrinii Leandri
Euphorbia peltata Roxb.
Euphorbia peninsularis I.M.Johnst.
Euphorbia pentadactyla Griseb
Euphorbia pentagona Haw. (s)
Euphorbia pentlandii Boiss.
Euphorbia pentops A.C.White, R.A.Dyer & B.Sloane (s)
Euphorbia peperomioides Boiss.
Euphorbia peplidion Engelm. - Low spurge
Euphorbia peplis L. - Purple spurge
Euphorbia peplus L. - Petty spurge
Euphorbia perangusta R.A.Dyer (s)
Euphorbia perangustifolia S.Carter
Euphorbia perarmata S.Carter1992 (s)
Euphorbia perbracteata Gage
Euphorbia perennans (Shinners) Warnock & I.M.Johnst.
Euphorbia pereskiifolia Baill. (s) (= Synadenium pereskiifolium)
Euphorbia perfoliata Scheutz
Euphorbia pergracilis P.G.Mey.
Euphorbia peritropoides (Millsp.) V.W.Steinm. (= Pedilanthus peritropoides)
Euphorbia perlignea McVaugh
Euphorbia perpera N.E.Br. (s)
Euphorbia perplexa L.C.Leach (s)
Euphorbia perplexa var. kasamana L.C.Leach (s)
Euphorbia perplexa var. perplexa (s)
Euphorbia perrieri Drake (s)
Euphorbia perrieri var. elongata Denis (s)
Euphorbia perrieri var. perrieri (s)
Euphorbia persistentifolia L.C.Leach (s)
Euphorbia personata Croizat & V.W.Steinm. (s) (= Pedilanthus personatus)
Euphorbia peruviana L.C.Wheeler
Euphorbia pervilleana Baillon (s)
Euphorbia pestalozzae Boiss.
Euphorbia petala Ewart & L.R.Kerr
Euphorbia pervittata S.Carter (s)
Euphorbia petiolaris Sims (s) - Manchineel berry
Euphorbia petiolata Banks & Sol.
Euphorbia petitiana A.Rich.
Euphorbia petraea S.Carter (s)
Euphorbia petricola P.R.O.Bally & S.Carter (s)
Euphorbia petrina S.Watson
Euphorbia petrophila C.A.Mey.
Euphorbia pettersonii Svent.
Euphorbia pfeilii Pax
Euphorbia philippiana (Klotzsch & Garcke ex Klotzsch) Boiss.
Euphorbia phillipsiae N.E.Br. (s)
Euphorbia phillipsioides S.Carter (s)
Euphorbia phosphorea Mart. (s)
Euphorbia phylloclada Boiss. (s)
Euphorbia phymatosperma Boiss. & Gaill. ex Boiss.
Euphorbia phymatosperma ssp. cernua (Coss. & Durieu) Vindt
Euphorbia phymatosperma ssp. phymatosperma
Euphorbia physalifolia Boiss.
Euphorbia phosocaulos Mouterde
Euphorbia physoclada Boiss. (s)
Euphorbia picachensis Brandegee
Euphorbia pillansii N.E.Br. (s)
Euphorbia pillansii var. albovirens A.C.White, R.A.Dyer & B.Sloane (s)
Euphorbia pillansii var. pillansii (s)
Euphorbia pillansii var. ramosissima A.C.White, R.A.Dyer & B.Sloane (s)
Euphorbia pilosa L.
Euphorbia pilosa ssp. ojensis Stepanov
Euphorbia pilosa ssp. pilosa
Euphorbia pilosissima S.Carter
Euphorbia pinariona Urb.
Euphorbia pinetorum (Small) G.L.Webster - Pineland spurge
Euphorbia pinkavana I.M.Johnst.
Euphorbia pionosperma V.W.Steinm. & Felger
Euphorbia pirottae A.Terracc. (s)
Euphorbia piscatoria Aiton (s)
Euphorbia piscidermis M.G.Gilbert (s)
Euphorbia piscida Hub.-Mor. & M.S.Khan ex M.S.Khan
Euphorbia pitcairnensis N.E.Br.
Euphorbia pithyusa L.
Euphorbia pithyusa ssp. cupanii (Guss. ex Bertol.) Radcl.-Sm.
Euphorbia pithyusa ssp. dianthifolia (Lojac.) Oudejans
Euphorbia pithyusa ssp. pithyusa
Euphorbia plagiantha Drake (s) - Fish skin euphorb
Euphorbia planiceps A.C.White, R.A.Dyer & B.Sloane (s)
Euphorbia planiticola D.C.Hassall (s)
Euphorbia platycephala Pax (s)
Euphorbia platyclada Rauh (s)
Euphorbia platyclada var. hardyi Rauh (s)
Euphorbia platyclada var. platyclada (s)
Euphorbia platyphyllos L. - Broad-leaved spurge
Euphorbia platypoda Pax
Euphorbia platyrrhiza L.C.Leach (s)
Euphorbia platysperma Engelm. ex S.Watson
Euphorbia plebeia Boiss.
Euphorbia plenispina S.Carter (s)
Euphorbia plicata S.Watson
Euphorbia plumerioides Teijsm. ex Hassk. (s)
Euphorbia plummeriae S.Watson
Euphorbia podadenia Boiss.
Euphorbia podocarpifolia Urb. (s)
Euphorbia poecilophylla (Prokh.) Prokh.
Euphorbia poeppigii (Klotzsch & Garcke ex Klotzsch) Boiss.
Euphorbia poissonii Pax (s)
Euphorbia polyacantha Boiss. (s)
Euphorbia polyantha Pax (s)
Euphorbia polycarpa Benth.
Euphorbia polycephala Marloth (s)
Euphorbia polychroma Anton Josef Kerner - Cushion spurge; Cushion euphorbia (see also Euphorbia epithymoides)
Euphorbia polycnemoides Hochst. ex Boiss.
Euphorbia polygalifolia Boiss. & Reut. ex Boiss.
Euphorbia polygona Haw. (s)
Euphorbia polygonifolia L.
Euphorbia polyphylla Engelm. ex Holz. - Lesser Florida spurge
Euphorbia polytimetica (Prokh.) Prokh.
Euphorbia ponderosa S.Carter (s)
Euphorbia pondii Millsp.
Euphorbia popayanensis Prokh.
Euphorbia porphyrantha Phil. (s)
Euphorbia porphyrastra Hand.-Mazz.
Euphorbia porteriana (Small) Oudejans
Euphorbia porteriana var. keyensis (Small) Oudejans
Euphorbia porteriana var. porteriana
Euphorbia porteriana var. scoparia (Small) Oudejans
Euphorbia portlandica L. - Portland spurge
Euphorbia portucasadiana (Croizat) Subils
Euphorbia portulacoides L. (s)
Euphorbia portulacoides ssp. collina  (Phil.) Croizat (s)
Euphorbia portulacoides ssp. major  (Müll.Arg.) Croizat (s)
Euphorbia portulacoides ssp. portulacoides (s)
Euphorbia postii Boiss.
Euphorbia potanii Prokh.
Euphorbia potentilloides Boiss.
Euphorbia potosina Fernald
Euphorbia prieuriana Baillon
Euphorbia primulifolia Baker (s)
Euphorbia primulifolia var. begardii Cremers (s)
Euphorbia primulifolia var. primulifolia (s)
Euphorbia proballyana L.C.Leach (s)
Euphorbia proballyana var. multangula S.Carter (s)
Euphorbia proballyana var. proballyana (s)
Euphorbia proctorii (D.G.Burch) Correll
Euphorbia prolifera Buch.-Ham. ex D.Don
Euphorbia promeocarpa P.H.Davis
Euphorbia prona S.Carter (s)
Euphorbia propingua N.E.Br.
Euphorbia prostrata Aiton
Euphorbia prostrata ssp. caudirhiza Fosberg
Euphorbia prostrata ssp. prostrata
Euphorbia przewalskii Prokh.
Euphorbia psammophila Ule (s)
Euphorbia pseudagraria P.A.Smirn.
Euphorbia pseudoapios Maire & Weiller (s)
Euphorbia pseudoburuana P.R.O.Bally & S.Carter (s)
Euphorbia pseudocactus A.Berger (s)
Euphorbia pseudodendroides H.Lindb.
Euphorbia pseudoduseimata R.A.Dyer (s)
Euphorbia pseudofalcata Chiov.
Euphorbia pseudofulva Miranda
Euphorbia pseudoglareosa Klokov
Euphorbia pseudoglobosa Marloth (s)
Euphorbia pseudograntii Pax (s)
"Euphorbia pseudograntii" Bruyns 2006 (non Pax: preoccupied) (s) (= Synadenium grantii)
Euphorbia pseudohirsuta Bruyns (s) (= Monadenium hirsutum)
Euphorbia pseudohypogaea Dinter (s)
Euphorbia pseudolaevis Bruyns (s) (= Monadenium laeve)
Euphorbia pseudolucida Schur
Euphorbia pseudomollis Bruyns (s) (= Synadenium molle)
Euphorbia pseudonervosa Bruyns (s) (= Monadenium nervosum)
Euphorbia pseudonudicaulis Bruyns (s) (= Monadenium nudicaule)
Euphorbia pseudopetiolata Bruyns (s) (= Monadenium petiolatum)
Euphorbia pseudoracemosa (P.R.O.Bally) Bruyns (s) (= Monadenium pseudoracemosum)
Euphorbia pseudoracemosa var. lorifolia (P.R.O.Bally) Bruyns (s) (= Monadenium pseudoracemosum var. lorifolium)
Euphorbia pseudoracemosa var. pseudoracemosa (s) (= Monadenium pseudoracemosum var. pseudoracemosum)
Euphorbia pseudosikkimensis (Hurus. & Tanaka) Radcl.-Sm.
Euphorbia pseudosimplex Bruyns (s) (= Monadenium simplex)
Euphorbia pseudostellata Bruyns (s) (= Monadenium stellatum)
Euphorbia pseudotrinervis Bruyns (s) (= Monadenium trinerve)
Euphorbia pseudotuberosa Pax (s)
Euphorbia pseudovolkensii Bruyns (s) (= Synadenium volkensii)
Euphorbia pteroclada L.C.Leach (s)
Euphorbia pterococca Brot.
Euphorbia pteroneura A.Berger (s)
Euphorbia pubentissima Michx. - False flowering spurge
Euphorbia puberula Fernald
Euphorbia pubicaulis S.Moore
Euphorbia pubiglans N.E.Br. (s)
Euphorbia pudibunda (P.R.O.Bally) Bruyns (s) (= Monadenium pudibundum)
Euphorbia pudibunda var. lanata (S.Carter) Bruyns (s) (= Monadenium pudibundum var. lanatum)
Euphorbia pudibunda var. rotundifolia (Malaysse & Lecron) Bruyns (s) (= Monadenium pudibundum var. rotundifolium)
Euphorbia pudibunda var. pudibunda (s) (= Monadenium pudibundum var. pudibundum)
Euphorbia pueblensis Brandegee
Euphorbia pugniformis Boiss. (s)
Euphorbia pulcherrima Willd. ex Klotzsch (s) - Poinsettia
Euphorbia pulvinata Marloth (s) - Pincushion euphorbia
Euphorbia pumicicola Huft
Euphorbia punctata Delile
Euphorbia punctulata Andersson
Euphorbia punicea Sw. (s)
Euphorbia purpurea (Raf.) Fernald - Darlington's glade spurge
Euphorbia pusilla Lag.
Euphorbia pycnostegia Boiss.
Euphorbia pygmaea Ledeb.
Euphorbia pyrenaica Jord.
Euphorbia pyrifolia Lam. (s)
Euphorbia pyrifolia var. coriacea Radcl.-Sm. (s)
Euphorbia pyrifolia var. pyrifolia (s)

Q

Euphorbia qarad Deflers (s)
Euphorbia quadrangularis Pax (s)
Euphorbia quadrata Nel (s)
Euphorbia quadrialata Pax (s)
Euphorbia quadrilatera L.C.Leach (s)
Euphorbia quadrispina S.Carter (s)
Euphorbia quaitensis S.Carter (s)
Euphorbia quartziticola Leandri (s)
Euphorbia quinquecostata Volkens (s)
Euphorbia quintasii Jord.
Euphorbia quitensis Boiss.

R

Euphorbia radians Benth. (s) - Sun spurge
Euphorbia radians var. radians (s)
Euphorbia radians var. stormiae  (Croizat) Rzed. & S.Calderón (s)
Euphorbia radiifera L.C.Leach
Euphorbia radioloides Boiss.
Euphorbia ramiglans N.E.Br. (s)
Euphorbia ramofraga Denis & Humbert ex Leandri (s)
Euphorbia ramosa Seaton
Euphorbia ramipressa Croizat
Euphorbia ramulosa L.C.Leach (s)
Euphorbia randrianjohanyi Haev. & Labat
Euphorbia rangovalensis Leandri (s)
Euphorbia raphanorrhiza (Millsp.) J.F.Macbr.
Euphorbia raphilippii Oudejans
Euphorbia rapulum Kar. & Kir. (s)
Euphorbia rauhii Haev. & Labat
Euphorbia razafindratsirae Lavranos (s)
Euphorbia razafinjohanyi Ursch & Leandri (s)
Euphorbia reboudiana Coss. ex Batt. & Trab.
Euphorbia reclinata P.R.O.Bally & S.Carter (s)
Euphorbia reconciliationis Radcl.-Sm.
Euphorbia rectirama N.E.Br. (s)
Euphorbia recurva Hook.f.
Euphorbia refugii Croizat
Euphorbia reghinii (Chiov.) Vollesen
Euphorbia regis-jubae Webb & Berthel. (s)
Euphorbia reineckei Pax ex Reinecke
Euphorbia remyi A.Gray ex Boiss.
Euphorbia reniformis Blume
Euphorbia renneyi (S.Carter) Bruyns (s) (= Monadenium renneyi)
Euphorbia repanda (Haw.) Sweet
Euphorbia repens K.Koch
Euphorbia repetita Hochst. ex A.Rich.
Euphorbia reptans P.R.O.Bally & S.Carter (s)
Euphorbia resinifera Berg (s) - Resin spurge
Euphorbia restiacea Benth. (s)
Euphorbia restituta N.E.Br. (s)
Euphorbia restricta R.A.Dyer (s)
Euphorbia retusa Forssk.
Euphorbia retrospina Rauh & Gérold (s)
Euphorbia reuteriana Boiss.
Euphorbia revoluta Engelm.
Euphorbia rhabdodes Boiss. (s)
Euphorbia rhabdotosperma Radcl.-Sm.
Euphorbia rhizophora (P.R.O.Bally) Bruyns (s) (= Monadenium rhizophorum)
Euphorbia rhombifolia Boiss. (s)
Euphorbia rhytidosperma Boiss. & Balansa ex Boiss.
Euphorbia rhytisperma (Klotzsch & Garcke) Engelm. ex Boiss.
Euphorbia richardsiae L.C.Leach (s)
Euphorbia richardsiae ssp. richardsiae (s)
Euphorbia richardsiae ssp. robusta L.C.Leach (s)
Euphorbia riebeckii Pax (s)
Euphorbia rigida M.Bieb. (s)
Euphorbia rimarum Coss. & Balansa ex Coss.
Euphorbia ritchiei (P.R.O.Bally) Bruyns (s) (= Monadenium ritchiei)
Euphorbia ritchiei ssp. marsabitensis (S.Carter) Bruyns (s) (= Monadenium ritchiei ssp. marsabitense)
Euphorbia ritchiei ssp. nyambensis (S.Carter) Bruyns (s) (= Monadenium ritchiei ssp. nyambense)
Euphorbia ritchiei ssp. ritchiei (s) (= Monadenium ritchiei ssp. ritchiei)
Euphorbia rivae Pax (s)
Euphorbia robecchii Pax (s)
Euphorbia robivelonae Rauh (s)
Euphorbia rochaensis (Croizat) Alonso Paz & Marchesi
Euphorbia rockii C.N.Forbes
Euphorbia rockii var. rockii C.N.Forbes
Euphorbia rockii var. grandiflora (Hillebrand) Oudejans
Euphorbia rockii var. rockii
Euphorbia roemeriana Scheele - Roemer's spurge
Euphorbia rohlenae Velen.
Euphorbia roschanica (Ikonn.) Czerep.
Euphorbia rosea Retz.
Euphorbia roseana (Marn.-Lap. ex Demoly) J.-P.Castillon & J.-B.Castillon (s)
Euphorbia rosescens E.L.Bridges & Orzell
Euphorbia rossiana Pax (s)
Euphorbia rossii Rauh & Buchloh (s)
Euphorbia rosularis Al.Fed.
Euphorbia rothiana Spreng.
Euphorbia rothrockii (Millsp.) Oudejans
Euphorbia rowlandii R.A.Dyer (s)
Euphorbia royleana Boiss. (s) - Churee
Euphorbia rubella Pax (s)
Euphorbia rubriflora N.E.Br.
Euphorbia rubromarginata L.E.Newton (s)
Euphorbia rubriseminalis S.Carter (s)
Euphorbia rubrispinosa S.Carter (s)
Euphorbia rubrostriata Drake
Euphorbia rudis N.E.Br. (s)
Euphorbia rudolfii N.E.Br. (s)
Euphorbia ruficeps S.Carter (s)
Euphorbia rugosiflora L.C.Leach (s)
Euphorbia ruizlealii Subils
Euphorbia rupestris C.A.Mey. ex Ledeb.
Euphorbia ruscifolia Boiss.
Euphorbia ruscinonensis Boiss.
Euphorbia rutilis (Millsp.) Standl. & Steyerm.
Euphorbia rzedowskii McVaugh

S

Euphorbia sabulicola Boiss.
Euphorbia saccharata Boiss.
Euphorbia sachetiana (J.Florence) Govaerts
Euphorbia sahendi Bornm.
Euphorbia sajanensis (Boiss.) Baikov
Euphorbia sakarahaensis Rauh (s)
Euphorbia salicifolia Host
Euphorbia salsicola S.Carter
Euphorbia salota Leandri (s)
Euphorbia salsuginosa (McVaugh) Radcl.-Sm. & Govaerts
Euphorbia samburuensis P.R.O.Bally & S.Carter (s)
Euphorbia sampsonii Hance
Euphorbia sanasunitensis Hand.-Mazz.
Euphorbia sancta Pax
Euphorbia sanctaecatharinae A.A.Fayad
Euphorbia sanmartensis Rusby
Euphorbia santapaui A.N.Henry (s)
Euphorbia sapiifolia Baillon
Euphorbia sapinii De Wild. (s)
Euphorbia sarawschanica Regel
Euphorbia sarcodes Boiss. (s)
Euphorbia sarcostemmatoides Dinter
Euphorbia sarcostemmoides J.H.Willis (s)
Euphorbia sareptana A.Becker
Euphorbia sarmentosa Welw. ex Pax
Euphorbia saurica Baikov
Euphorbia saxatilis Jacq.
Euphorbia saxicola Radcl.-Sm.
Euphorbia saxorum P.R.O.Bally & S.Carter (s)
Euphorbia scabrifolia S.Kurz
Euphorbia scandens Kunth
Euphorbia scarlatina S.Carter (s)
Euphorbia scatorrhiza S.Carter (s)
Euphorbia schaijesii (Malaisse) Bruyns (s) (= Monadenium schaijesii)
Euphorbia scheffleri Pax (s)
Euphorbia schickendantzii Hieron.
Euphorbia schillingii Radcl.-Sm.
Euphorbia schimperi C.Presl (s)
Euphorbia schimperiana Scheele
Euphorbia schimperiana var. pubescens (N.E.Br.) S.Carter
Euphorbia schimperiana var. schimperiana
Euphorbia schimperiana var. velutina N.E.Br.
Euphorbia schinzii Pax (s)
Euphorbia schizacantha Pax (s)
Euphorbia schizolepis F.Muell. ex Boiss.
Euphorbia schizoloba Engelm.
Euphorbia schlechtendalii Boiss. (s)
Euphorbia schlechtendalii var. pacifica McVaugh
Euphorbia schlechtendalii var. schlechtendalii
Euphorbia schlechtendalii var. websteri McVaugh
Euphorbia schlechteri Pax
Euphorbia schmitzii L.C.Leach (s)
Euphorbia schoenlandii Pax (s)
Euphorbia schottiana Boiss.
Euphorbia schubei Pax (s) (= Monadenium schubei)
Euphorbia schugnanica B.Fedtsch. ex O.Fedtsch. & B.Fedtsch. (s)
Euphorbia schultzii Benth.
Euphorbia schumannii Radcl.-Sm.
Euphorbia schweinfurthii Balf.f. (s)
Euphorbia sciadophila Boiss.
Euphorbia scitula L.C.Leach (s)
Euphorbia sclerocyathium Korovin & Popov
Euphorbia sclerophylla Boiss.
Euphorbia scopulorum Brandegee
Euphorbia scordiifolia Jacq.
Euphorbia scotanum Schltdl. (s)
Euphorbia scripta Sommier & Levier
Euphorbia scyphadena S.Carter (s)
Euphorbia seclusa N.E.Br.
Euphorbia sebsebei M.G.Gilbert (s)
Euphorbia segetalis L. – Grainfield spurge
Euphorbia segoviensis (Klotzsch & Garcke ex Klotzsch) Boiss.
Euphorbia seguieriana Neck.
Euphorbia seguieriana ssp. loiseleurii (Rouy) Greuter & Burdet
Euphorbia seguieriana ssp. niciciana (Borbás ex J. Novák) Rech.f.
Euphorbia seguieriana ssp. seguieriana
Euphorbia seguieriana ssp. seguieriana var. arenivaga (Martin-Donos) Oudejans
Euphorbia seguieriana ssp. seguieriana var. dentata (Chabert) Oudejans
Euphorbia seguieriana ssp. seguieriana var. intermedia (S?vul.) Oudejans
Euphorbia seguieriana ssp. seguieriana var. lanceolata (Cariot) Oudejans
Euphorbia seguieriana ssp. seguieriana var. latifolia (J.J.Schmitz & Regel) Oudejans
Euphorbia seguieriana ssp. seguieriana var. seguieriana
Euphorbia seguieriana ssp. seguieriana var. sturii (Holuby) Oudejans
Euphorbia seibanica Lavranos & A.N.Al-Gifri (s)
Euphorbia sekukuniensis R.A.Dyer (s)
Euphorbia seleri Donn.Sm.
Euphorbia selloi (Klotzsch & Garcke ex Klotzsch) Boiss.
Euphorbia selousiana S.Carter (s)
Euphorbia semperflorens L.C.Leach (s)
Euphorbia sendaica Makino
Euphorbia senguptae Balakr. & Subram.
Euphorbia senilis Standl. & Steyerm.
Euphorbia sennenii Pau
Euphorbia sennii Chiov. (s)
Euphorbia septemsulcata Vierh. (s)
Euphorbia septentrionalis P.R.O.Bally & S.Carter (s)
Euphorbia septentrionalis ssp. gamugofana M.G.Gilbert
Euphorbia septentrionalis ssp. septentrionalis
Euphorbia sepulta P.R.O.Bally & S.Carter (s)
Euphorbia seracomans Bubani
Euphorbia serendipita L.E.Newton (s)
Euphorbia seretii De Wild. (s)
Euphorbia seretii ssp. seretii
Euphorbia seretii ssp. variantissima L.C.Leach
Euphorbia seriocarpa Hand.-Mazz.
Euphorbia serpens Kunth
Euphorbia serpentini Novak
Euphorbia serpyllifolia Pers.
Euphorbia serpyllifolia ssp. hirtula (S.Watson) Oudejans
Euphorbia serpyllifolia ssp. serpyllifolia
Euphorbia serrata L. – Serrated spurge, saw-toothed spurge
Euphorbia serratifolia S.Carter
Euphorbia serrula Engelm.
Euphorbia sessei Oudejans
Euphorbia sessiliflora Roxb. (s)
Euphorbia sessilifolia Klotzsch ex Boiss.
Euphorbia setiloba Engelm. ex Torr.
Euphorbia setispina S.Carter (s)
Euphorbia sewerzowii (Herd. ex Prokh.) N.V.Pavlov
Euphorbia shaferi (Millsp.) L.G.Gonzáles & Bisse
Euphorbia sharkoensis Baillon
Euphorbia sharmae U.C.Battach.
Euphorbia shebeliensis (M.G. Gilbert) Bruyns (s) (= Monadenium shebeliense)
Euphorbia shouanensis H.Keng
Euphorbia sieboldiana Morr. & Decne.
Euphorbia sieboldiana var. grandifolia (Franch. & Sav. ex Hurus.) Oudejans
Euphorbia sieboldiana var. idzuensis (Hurus.) Oudejans
Euphorbia sieboldiana var. ohsumiensis (Hurus.) Hatus.
Euphorbia sieboldiana var. peninsularis (Hurus.) M.Kitagawa
Euphorbia sieboldiana var. sieboldiana
Euphorbia sieboldiana var. sylvatica (Hurus.) Oudejans
Euphorbia sikkimensis Boiss.
Euphorbia silenifolia  (Haw.) Sweet (s)
Euphorbia similiramea S.Carter (s)
Euphorbia sinclairiana Benth. (s) (= Euphorbia elata)
Euphorbia sintenisii Boiss. ex J.Freyn
Euphorbia sipolisii N.E.Br. (s)
Euphorbia skottsbergii Sherff
Euphorbia smallii Oudejans
Euphorbia smirnovii Geltman
Euphorbia smithii S.Carter (s)
Euphorbia socotrana Balf.f. (s)
Euphorbia sogdiana Popov
Euphorbia sojakii (Chrtek & Křísa) Dubovik ex Dubovik et al.
Euphorbia somalensis Pax (s)
Euphorbia songweana S.Carter (s)
Euphorbia sonorae Rose
Euphorbia soobyi McVaugh
Euphorbia soongarica Boiss.
Euphorbia sororia Schrenk
Euphorbia sparrmanii Boiss. (= Euphorbia ramosissima Hook. & Arn. non Loiseleur (nom. illeg.), Chamaesyce sparrmanii (Boissier) Hurusawa)
Euphorbia sparsiflora A.Heller
Euphorbia sparsiglandulosa J.Ponert
Euphorbia spartaria N.E.Br. (s)
Euphorbia spartiformis Mobayen
Euphorbia spathulata Lam. – Roughpod spurge, warty spurge
Euphorbia spathulata var. mexicana (Engelm.) Oudejans
Euphorbia spathulata var. spathulata
Euphorbia spathulifolia (Haw.) Steud.
Euphorbia speciosa L.C.Leach (s)
Euphorbia specksii Rauh (s)
Euphorbia spectabilis (S.Carter) Bruyns (s) (= Monadenium spectabile)
Euphorbia sphaerorrhiza Benth. (s)
Euphorbia spicata E.Mey. ex Boiss. (s)
Euphorbia spinea N.E.Br. (s)
Euphorbia spinidens (Bornm. ex Prokh.) Prokh.
Euphorbia spinosa L. (s)
Euphorbia spinosa ssp. ligustica  (Fiori) Pignatti
Euphorbia spinosa ssp. spinosa
Euphorbia spinulosa (S.Carter) Bruyns (s) (= Monadenium spinulosum)
Euphorbia spiralis Balf.f. (s)
Euphorbia spissiflora S.Carter
Euphorbia spruceana Boiss.
Euphorbia squamigera Loisel. (s)
Euphorbia squamosa Willd.
Euphorbia squamosa var. serrata (Boiss.) Oudejans
Euphorbia squamosa var. squamosa
Euphorbia squamosa var. talyschensis (Boiss. & Buhse) Oudejans
Euphorbia squamosa var. wilhelmsiana (K.Koch) Oudejans
Euphorbia squarrosa Haw.
Euphorbia standleyi (Millsp.) Oudejans
Euphorbia stapelioides Boiss. (s)
Euphorbia stapfii A.Berger (s)
Euphorbia stellata Willd. (s)
Euphorbia stellispina  (Haw.) (s)
Euphorbia stellispina var. astrispina  (N.E.Br.) A.C.White, R.A.Dyer & B.Sloane
Euphorbia stellispina var. stellispina 
Euphorbia stenocaulis Bruyns (s)
Euphorbia stenoclada Baillon (s)
Euphorbia stenoclada ssp. ambatofinandranae  (Leandri) Cremers
Euphorbia stenoclada ssp. stenoclada
Euphorbia stenophylla (Klotzsch & Garcke ex Klotzsch) Boiss.
Euphorbia stevenii F.M.Bailey (s)
Euphorbia steyermarkii Standl. ex Standl. & Steyerm.
Euphorbia strictospora Engelm.
Euphorbia stoddartii Frosberg
Euphorbia stolonifera Marloth ex A.C.White, R.A.Dyer & B.Sloane (s)
Euphorbia stracheyi Boiss.
Euphorbia strangulata N.E.Br. (s)
Euphorbia strangulata ssp. deminuens L.C.Leach
Euphorbia strangulata ssp. strangulata
Euphorbia striata Thunb. (s)
Euphorbia stricta L.
Euphorbia strictior Holz. – Panhandle spurge
Euphorbia strigosa Hook. & Arn. (s)
Euphorbia stygiana H.C.Watson (s)
Euphorbia stygiana ssp. santamariae H.Schäf.
Euphorbia stygiana ssp. stygiana
Euphorbia subcordata C.A.Mey. ex Ledeb.
Euphorbia subhastifolia Klokov ex Dubovik & Klokov
Euphorbia submammillaris  (A.Berger) A.Berger (s)
Euphorbia subpeltata S.Watson
Euphorbia subpeltatophylla Rauh (s)
Euphorbia subreniformis S.Watson
Euphorbia subsalsa Hiern (s)
Euphorbia subsalsa ssp. fluvialis L.C.Leach
Euphorbia subsalsa ssp. subsalsa
Euphorbia subscandens P.R.O.Bally & S.Carter (s)
Euphorbia subterminalis N.E.Br.
Euphorbia subtrifoliata Rusby
Euphorbia subulatifolia Hurus.
Euphorbia succedanea L.C.Wheeler
Euphorbia sudanica A.Chev. (s)
Euphorbia suffulta P.Bruyns (s)
Euphorbia sulcata De Lens ex Loisel.
Euphorbia sulcata ssp. maroccana Molero, Rovira & J.Vicens.
Euphorbia sulcata ssp. sulcata
Euphorbia sultan-hassei Strid, B.Bentzer, R.von Bothmer, L.Engstrand & M.Gustafsson (s)
Euphorbia sumati S.Carter (s)
Euphorbia sumbawensis Boiss.
Euphorbia superans Nel (s)
Euphorbia suppressa Marx (s)
Euphorbia surinamensis Lanj.
Euphorbia susanholmesiae Binojk. & Gopalan (s)
Euphorbia susannae Marloth (s) – Suzanne's spurge
Euphorbia suzannaemarnierae Rauh & Pétignat (s)
Euphorbia synadenium Ridl. (s)
Euphorbia syncalycina Bruyns (s) (= Synadenium calycinum)
Euphorbia syncameronii Bruyns (s) (= Synadenium cameronii)
Euphorbia systyla Edgew.
Euphorbia systyloides Pax
Euphorbia systyloides ssp. porcaticapsa S.Carter
Euphorbia systyloides ssp. systyloides
Euphorbia szechuanica Pax & K.Hoffmann
Euphorbia szovitsii Fisch. & C.A.Mey.

T

Euphorbia taboraensis A.Hässl. (s)
Euphorbia tacnensis Phil.
Euphorbia taihsiensis (Chaw & Koutnik) Oudejans
Euphorbia taitensis Boiss.
Euphorbia taiwaniana S.S.Ying
Euphorbia talaina Radcl.-Sm.
Euphorbia talastavica (Prokh.) Prokh.
Euphorbia taluticola Wiggins
Euphorbia tamanduana Boiss.
Euphorbia tamaulipasana (Millsp.) Oudejans
Euphorbia tanaensis (s)
Euphorbia tanaitica Paczoski
Euphorbia tannensis Spreng. (s)
Euphorbia tannensis ssp. eremophila (A.Cunn.) D.C.Hassall
Euphorbia tannensis ssp. tannensis
Euphorbia tanquahuete Sessé & Moc. (s)
Euphorbia tarapacana Phil.
Euphorbia tardieuana (s)
Euphorbia tarokoensis Hayata
Euphorbia taruensis S.Carter (s)
Euphorbia tashiroi Hayata
Euphorbia tauricola Prokh.
Euphorbia taurinensis All.
Euphorbia taurinensis var. brachyceras (P.Candargy) Oudejans
Euphorbia taurinensis var. isophylla (K.Malý) Oudejans
Euphorbia taurinensis var. taurinensis
Euphorbia taxifolia Burm.f.
Euphorbia tchenngoi (Soják) Radcl.-Sm.
Euphorbia teheranica Boiss.
Euphorbia tehuacana (Millsp.) & V.W.Steinm. (= Pedilanthus tehuacanus) (s)
Euphorbia teixeirae L.C.Leach (s)
Euphorbia teke Pax (s)
Euphorbia telephioides Chapm. – Telephus spurge
Euphorbia tenax W.J.Burchell (s)
Euphorbia tenera S.Watson
Euphorbia tenuirama Schweinf. ex A.Berger (s)
Euphorbia tenuispinosa Gilli (s)
Euphorbia tenuispinosa var. robusta P.R.O.Bally & S.Carter
Euphorbia tenuispinosa var. tenuispinosa
Euphorbia terracina L. – Geraldton carnation weed
Euphorbia terracina var. alexandrina (Delile) Z.El-Karemy
Euphorbia terracina var. terracina
Euphorbia tescorum S.Carter (s)
Euphorbia teskensuensis A.O.Orazova
Euphorbia tessmannii Mansf.
Euphorbia tetracantha Rendle (s)
Euphorbia tetracanthoides Pax (s)
Euphorbia tetragona Haw. (s)
Euphorbia tetrapora Engelm. – Weak spurge
Euphorbia tetraptera
Euphorbia tettensis Klotzsch
Euphorbia tetuanensis Pau
Euphorbia texana Boiss. – Texas spurge
Euphorbia therica L.C.Wheeler
Euphorbia thinophila Phil. (s)
Euphorbia tholicola L.C.Leach (s)
Euphorbia thompsonii Holmboe
Euphorbia thomsoniana Boiss.
Euphorbia thouarsiana (s)
Euphorbia thulinii (s)
Euphorbia thymifolia L. (= Chamaesyce thymifolia)
Euphorbia thyrsoidea Boiss.
Euphorbia tianshanica Prokh. & Popov
Euphorbia tibetica Boiss.
Euphorbia tinianensis Hosok.
Euphorbia tirucalli – Indian tree spurge, milk bush, pencil tree (s)
Euphorbia tisserantii A.Chev. R.Sillans ex A.Chev.
Euphorbia tithymaloides L. (= Pedilanthus tithymaloides) – "Devil's backbone", "redbird cactus", cimora misha (Peru) (s)
Euphorbia tithymaloides ssp. angustifolia (Poit.) V.W.Steinm. (= Pedilanthus tithymaloides ssp. angustifolius)
Euphorbia tithymaloides ssp. bahamensis (Millsp.) V.W.Steinm. (= Pedilanthus tithymaloides ssp. bahamensis)
Euphorbia tithymaloides ssp. jamaicensis (Millsp. & Britton) V.W.Steinm. (= Pedilanthus tithymaloides ssp. jamaicensis)
Euphorbia tithymaloides ssp. padifolia (L.) V.W.Steinm. (= Pedilanthus tithymaloides ssp. padifolius)
Euphorbia tithymaloides ssp. parasitica (Klotzsch. & Garcke) V.W.Steinm. (= Pedilanthus tithymaloides ssp. parasiticus)
Euphorbia tithymaloides ssp. retusa (Benth.) V.W.Steinm. (= Pedilanthus tithymaloides ssp. retusus)
Euphorbia tithymaloides ssp. smallii (Millsp.) V.W.Steinm. (= Pedilanthus tithymaloides ssp. smallii)
Euphorbia tithymaloides ssp. tithymaloides (= Pedilanthus tithymaloides ssp. tithymaloides)
Euphorbia tlapanensis Hargreaves
Euphorbia togakusensis Hayata
Euphorbia tomentella Engelm. ex Boiss.
Euphorbia tomentulosa S.Watson (s)
Euphorbia torralbasii Urb.
Euphorbia torrei (L.C.Leach) Bruyns (= Monadenium torrei) (s)
Euphorbia torta Pax & K.Hoffmann (s)
Euphorbia tortilis Rottler ex W.Ainslie (s)
Euphorbia tortirama R.A.Dyer (s)
Euphorbia tortistyla N.E.Br. (s)
Euphorbia tozzii Chiov.
Euphorbia trachysperma Engelm.
Euphorbia trancapatae (Croizat) J.F.Macbr.
Euphorbia transoxana (Prokh.) Prokh.
Euphorbia transtagana Boiss.
Euphorbia transvaalensis Schltr. (s)
Euphorbia tranzschelii (Prokh.) Prokh.
Euphorbia triangolensis Bruyns (= Synadenium angolense) (s)
Euphorbia triaculeata Forssk. (s)
Euphorbia trialata (Huft) V.W.Steinm.
Euphorbia triangularis Desf. ex A.Berger (s)
Euphorbia trichadenia Pax (s)
Euphorbia trichadenia var. gibbsiae N.E.Br.
Euphorbia trichadenia var. trichadenia
Euphorbia trichiocyma S.Carter
Euphorbia trichocardia L.B.Sm.
Euphorbia trichophylla
Euphorbia trichotoma Kunth – Sanddune spurge
Euphorbia tricolor Greenm.
Euphorbia tridentata Lam. (s)
Euphorbia triflora Schott, Nyman & Kotschy
Euphorbia trigona Mill. – African milk tree (s)
Euphorbia triloba Sessé & Moc.
Euphorbia trinervia Schumach.
Euphorbia triodonta (Prokh.) Prokh.
Euphorbia tripartita S.Carter (s)
Euphorbia triphylla (Klotzsch & Garcke ex Klotzsch) Oudejans
Euphorbia troyana Urb.
Euphorbia tshuiensis (Prokh.) Sergievsk. ex Krylov
Euphorbia tsimbazazae Leandri
Euphorbia tuberculata Jacq. (s)
Euphorbia tuberculata var. macowanii A.C.White, R.A.Dyer & B.Sloane
Euphorbia tuberculata var. tuberculata
Euphorbia tuberculatoides N.E.Br. (s)
Euphorbia tuberifera N.E.Br. (s)
Euphorbia tuberosa L. (s)
Euphorbia tubiglans Marloth ex. R.A.Dyer (s)
Euphorbia tuckeyana Steud. ex P.B.Webb (s)
Euphorbia tuerckheimii Urb.
Euphorbia tugelensis N.E.Br. (s)
Euphorbia tulearensis (s)
Euphorbia tumbaensis De Wild.
Euphorbia tumistyla (D.G.Burch) Radcl.-Sm.
Euphorbia tunetana (Murbeck) Vierh. ex F.Buxbaum
Euphorbia turbiniformis Chiov. (s)
Euphorbia turczaninowii Kar. & Kir.
Euphorbia turkanensis S.Carter (s)
Euphorbia turkestanica Regel
Euphorbia turpinii Boiss.
Euphorbia tyraica Klokov & Artemcz. ex Klokov

U

Euphorbia ugandensis Pax & K.Hoffmann ex Pax
Euphorbia uhligiana Pax (s)
Euphorbia uliginosa Welw. ex Boiss.;
Euphorbia umbellulata Engelm. ex Boiss.
Euphorbia umbonata S.Carter (s)
Euphorbia umbraculiformis Rauh (s)
Euphorbia umbrosa Bert. ex Spreng.
Euphorbia umfoloziensis R.G.Peckover (s)
Euphorbia undulata M.Bieb.
Euphorbia undulatifolia Janse (s)
Euphorbia unicornis R.A.Dyer (s)
Euphorbia uniglandulosa S.Watson
Euphorbia uniglans M.G.Gilbert (s)
Euphorbia unispina N.E.Br. (s)
Euphorbia uralensis Fisch. ex Link
Euphorbia urbanii (Millsp.) Oudejans
Euphorbia urceolophora Parodi
Euphorbia usambarica Pax (s)
Euphorbia usambarica ssp. elliptica Pax (s)
Euphorbia usambarica ssp. usambarica (s)
Euphorbia uzmuk S.Carter & J.R.I.Wood (s)

V

 Euphorbia vaalputsiana L.C.Leach (s)
 Euphorbia vachellii Hook. & Arn.
 Euphorbia vaginulata Griseb (s)
 Euphorbia vajravelui Binojk. & N.P.Balakr. (s)
 Euphorbia valerianifolia Lam.
 Euphorbia valerii Standl.
 Euphorbia vallaris L.C.Leach (s)
 Euphorbia valliniana Belli
 Euphorbia vallismortuae (Millsp.) Howell
 Euphorbia vandermerwei R.A.Dyer (s)
 Euphorbia variabilis Ces.
 Euphorbia vauthieriana Boiss. 
 Euphorbia vedica S.Ter-Chatschat. 
 Euphorbia velleriflora (Klotzsch & Garcke ex Klotzsch) Boiss. 
 Euphorbia velligera S.Schauer ex Nees & S.Schauer 
 Euphorbia venenata Marloth  (s)
 Euphorbia venenifica Kotschy ex Boiss.  (s)
 Euphorbia veneris M.S.Khan 
 Euphorbia veneta Willd. 
 Euphorbia venteri L.C.Leach ex R.H.Archer & S.Carter  (s)
 Euphorbia verapazensis Standl. & Steyerm.  (s)
 Euphorbia vermiculata Raf. 
 Euphorbia verrucosa L. 
 Euphorbia verruculosa N.E.Br.  (s)
 Euphorbia versicolores G.Will.  (s)
 Euphorbia vervoorstii Subils 
 Euphorbia vestita Boiss. 
 Euphorbia vezorum Leandri 
 Euphorbia viatilis Ule 
 Euphorbia viduiflora L.C.Leach  (s)
 Euphorbia viguieri Denis  (s)
 Euphorbia viguieri var. ankarafantsiensis Ursch & Leandri 
 Euphorbia viguieri var. capuroniana Ursch & Leandri 
 Euphorbia viguieri var. tsimbazazae Ursch & Leandri 
 Euphorbia viguieri var. viguieri
 Euphorbia viguieri var. vilanandrensis Ursch & Leandri 
 Euphorbia villifera Scheele 
 Euphorbia villosa Waldst. & Kit. ex Willd. 
 Euphorbia villosa ssp. semivillosa (Prokh.) Oudejans 
 Euphorbia villosa ssp. valdevillosocarpa (Arvat. & Nyar.) R.Turner 
 Euphorbia villosa ssp. villosa
 Euphorbia viminea Hook.f. 
 Euphorbia violacea Greenm. 
 Euphorbia virgata Waldst. & Kit.
 Euphorbia viridis (Klotzsch & Garcke ex Klotzsch) Boiss. 
 Euphorbia viridula Cordemoy ex Radcl.-Sm. 
 Euphorbia virosa Willd.  (s)
 Euphorbia virosa ssp. arenicola L.C.Leach 
 Euphorbia virosa ssp. virosa
 Euphorbia viscoides Boiss. 
 Euphorbia vittata S.Carter  (s)
 Euphorbia volgensis Kryshtof. 
 Euphorbia volhynica Besser ex M.Raciborski 
 Euphorbia volkii Rech.f. 
 Euphorbia volkmanniae Dinter  (s)
 Euphorbia vulcanorum S.Carter  (s)

W

Euphorbia wakefieldii N.E.Br. (s)
Euphorbia waldsteinii (Soják) Radcl.-Sm.
Euphorbia waldsteinii var. jaxartica (Prokh.) Oudejans
Euphorbia waldsteinii var. orientalis (Boiss.) Oudejans
Euphorbia waldsteinii var. saratoi (Ardoino) Oudejans
Euphorbia waldsteinii var. waldsteinii
Euphorbia wallichii Hook.f.
Euphorbia wangii Oudejans
Euphorbia waringiae Rauh & R.Gerold (s)
Euphorbia waterbergensis R.A.Dyer (s)
Euphorbia weberbaueri R.Mansfeld (s)
Euphorbia wellbyi N.E.Br.
Euphorbia wellbyi var. wellbyi
Euphorbia wellbyi var. glabra S.Carter
Euphorbia welwitschii Boiss. & Reut.
Euphorbia wheeleri Baillon
Euphorbia whellanii L.C.Leach (s)
Euphorbia whyteana Baker f.
Euphorbia wildii L.C.Leach (s)
Euphorbia williamsonii L.C.Leach (s)
Euphorbia wilmaniae Marloth (s)
Euphorbia wilsonii (Millsp.) Correll
Euphorbia wittmannii Boiss.
Euphorbia woodii N.E.Br. (s)
Euphorbia wootonii Oudejans
Euphorbia woronowii Grossh.
Euphorbia wrightii Torr. & A.Gray (s) - Wright's spurge

X

Euphorbia xalapensis Kunth
Euphorbia xanti Engelm. ex Boiss. (s)
Euphorbia xbacensis Millsp.
Euphorbia xeropoda Brandegee
Euphorbia xylacantha Pax (s)
Euphorbia xylopoda Greenm.

Y

Euphorbia yamashitae Kitam.
Euphorbia yajinensis W.T.Wang
Euphorbia yaroslavii P.P.Poljakov
Euphorbia yattana (P.R.O.Bally) Bruyns (s) (= Monadenium yattanum)
Euphorbia yayalesia Urb.
Euphorbia yemenica Boiss.
Euphorbia yinshanica S.Q.Zhou
Euphorbia yucatanensis (Millsp.) Standl.

Z

Euphorbia zakamenae Leandri (s)
Euphorbia zambesiana Benth. (s)
Euphorbia zambesiana var. benguelensis (Pax) N.E.Br. (s)
Euphorbia zambesiana var. zambesiana (s)
Euphorbia zeylana N.E.Br.
Euphorbia zierioides Boiss.
Euphorbia zornioides Boiss.
Euphorbia zoutpansbergensis R.A.Dyer (s)

Notes

References 
  (2006): A new subgeneric classification for Euphorbia (Euphorbiaceae) in southern Africa based on ITS and psbA-trnH sequence data. Taxon 55(2): 397–420. HTML abstract
 & al. (2010). World Checklist of Malpighiales. The Board of Trustees of the Royal Botanic Gardens.
  (2003): The submersion of Pedilanthus into Euphorbia (Euphorbiaceae). Acta Botanica Mexicana 65: 45-50. PDF fulltext [English with Spanish abstract]
  (2002): Phylogenetic relationships in Euphorbieae (Euphorbiaceae) based on ITS and ndhF sequence data. Annals of the Missouri Botanical Garden 89(4): 453–490.  (HTML abstract, first page image)

Lists
Euphorbia